Independence County is a county located in the U.S. state of Arkansas. As of the 2020 census, the population was 37,938. The county seat is Batesville. Independence County is Arkansas's ninth county, formed on October 20, 1820, from a portion of Lawrence County and named in commemoration of the Declaration of Independence. It is an alcohol prohibition or dry county.

The Batesville, AR Micropolitan Statistical Area includes all of Independence County.

Geography

List of highways

 U.S. Highway 167
 Arkansas Highway 14
 Arkansas Highway 25
 Arkansas Highway 37
 Arkansas Highway 69
 Arkansas Highway 69 Business
 Arkansas Highway 87
 Arkansas Highway 106
 Arkansas Highway 122
 Arkansas Highway 157
 Arkansas Highway 230
 Arkansas Highway 233
 Arkansas Highway 333
 Arkansas Highway 367
 Arkansas Highway 394

Adjacent counties
Sharp County (north)
Lawrence County (northeast)
Jackson County (east)
White County (south)
Cleburne County (southwest)
Stone County (west)
Izard County (northwest)

Demographics

2020 census

As of the 2020 United States census, there were 37,938 people, 14,322 households, and 9,929 families residing in the county.

2000 census
As of the 2000 census, there were 34,233 people, 13,467 households, and 9,669 families residing in the county.  The population density was 45 people per square mile (17/km2).  There were 14,841 housing units at an average density of 19 per square mile (8/km2).  The racial makeup of the county was 94.91% White, 2.04% Black or African American, 0.45% Native American, 0.65% Asian, 0.03% Pacific Islander, 0.64% from other races, and 1.28% from two or more races.  1.53% of the population were Hispanic or Latino of any race.

There were 13,467 households, out of which 32.10% had children under the age of 18 living with them, 59.00% were married couples living together, 9.20% had a female householder with no husband present, and 28.20% were non-families. 25.50% of all households were made up of individuals, and 11.70% had someone living alone who was 65 years of age or older.  The average household size was 2.47 and the average family size was 2.95.

In the county, the population was spread out, with 24.50% under the age of 18, 9.20% from 18 to 24, 27.70% from 25 to 44, 24.10% from 45 to 64, and 14.50% who were 65 years of age or older.  The median age was 38 years. For every 100 females there were 96.30 males.  For every 100 females age 18 and over, there were 92.60 males.

The median income for a household in the county was $31,920, and the median income for a family was $38,444. Males had a median income of $27,284 versus $20,086 for females. The per capita income for the county was $16,163.  About 9.90% of families and 13.00% of the population were below the poverty line, including 16.10% of those under age 18 and 14.40% of those age 65 or over.

Government
Over the past few election cycles Independence County has trended heavily towards the GOP. The last Democrat (as of 2020) to carry this county was Bill Clinton in 1996.

Communities

Cities
 Batesville (county seat)
 Cave City
 Cushman
 Newark
 Southside

Towns
 Magness
 Moorefield
 Oil Trough
 Pleasant Plains
 Sulphur Rock

Census-designated places
 Bethesda
 Desha
 Floral
 Salado

Other unincorporated communities
 Antioch  (Independence County)
 Cedar Grove
 Charlotte
 Cord
 Dota
 Gainsboro
 Jamestown
 Limedale
 Locust Grove
 McHue
 Pfeiffer
 Rosie
 Sandtown
 Thida
 Walnut Grove

Townships

 Ashley
 Barren (contains part of Cave City)
 Big Bottom-Wycough-Logan Township (contains Newark)
 Black River-Marshell
 Cushman-Union (contains Cushman)
 Departee
 Dota
 Fairview (contains Pleasant Plains)
 Gainsboro
 Greenbrier
 Hill
 Huff
 Jefferson
 Liberty
 McHue (contains part of Batesville)
 Magness (contains Magness)
 Moorefield (contains Moorefield, part of Batesville)
 Oil Trough (contains Oil Trough)
 Relief
 Rosie
 Ruddell (contains most of Batesville)
 Salado
 Washington
 White River (contains Sulphur Rock)

Source:

See also
 List of lakes in Independence County, Arkansas
 James Sturch, state representative for Independence County
 National Register of Historic Places listings in Independence County, Arkansas

References

 
1820 establishments in Arkansas Territory
Populated places established in 1820